Amir (also Romanized as Amīr; also known as Deh-e Amīr) is a village in Dust Mohammad Rural District, in the Central District of Hirmand County, Sistan and Baluchestan Province, Iran. At the 2006 census, its population was 21, in 5 families.

References 

Populated places in Hirmand County